The Mitteldeutsche Zeitung (Central German Newspaper) is a regional daily newspaper for southern Saxony-Anhalt, Germany. Published in Halle with several local versions, the paper is owned by M. DuMont Schauberg, Cologne.

History and profile
The MZ'''s forerunner, Die Freiheit (Freedom), was first published on 16 April 1946 as an organ of the ruling SED in East Germany. On 17 March 1990, the Mitteldeutsche Zeitung was first published in the year of German reunification. The newspaper's publishing company, Mitteldeutschen Druck- und Verlagshaus GmbH und Co. KG, is also divided into several subsidiary companies, including the call center MZ-Dialog and the printing/publishing house Aroprint in Bernburg.

The Mitteldeutsche Zeitung is usually the only regional newspaper available where it is sold. In its area of circulation, mainly concentrated in the southern part of Saxony-Anhalt, the MZ has no competition from other regional dailies. The Magdeburg Volksstimme is circulated according to former GDR regional borders and does not overlap with the MZ, although the Volksstimme is sometimes sold against the Altmark Zeitung in the Altmark. Ninety-six percent of all local newspapers in Saxony-Anhalt are effectively unopposed by others.

Circulation
The MZ had a circulation of 456,000 copies during the third quarters of 1992. In 2001 its circulation was 332,000 copies.

The circulation of the paper was 294,694 copies in the first quarter of 2006. Its circulation during the second quarter of 2011 was 208,721 copies.

Local editions
 SaaleKurier, Halle (Saale)
 AnhaltKurier, Dessau-Roßlau
 Ascherslebener Zeitung, Aschersleben
 Bernburger Kurier, Bernburg (Saale)
 Bitterfelder Zeitung, Bitterfeld-Wolfen
 ElbeKurier, Wittenberg
 Jessener Land, Jessen (Elster)
 Köthener Zeitung, Köthen
 Neuer Landbote, Merseburg
 Mansfelder Zeitung, Eisleben
 Quedlinburger Harz Bote, Quedlinburg
 Sangerhäuser Zeitung, Sangerhausen
 Weißenfelser Zeitung, Weißenfels
 Zeitzer Zeitung, Zeitz
 Naumburger Tageblatt, Naumburg

References

Further reading
 Von der „Freiheit“ zur Mitteldeutschen Zeitung, Mitteldeutsches Druck- und Verlagshaus (editor), 1997
 Elizabeth Moore: Never the twain? „Ossies“ and „Wessies“ in a German newsroom. (Mitteldeutsche Zeitung, a former East German newspaper now under West German ownership)'' in Columbia Journalism Review, 1 July 1993

External links 
 Official website of the Mitteldeutsche Zeitung
 Free archive of Mitteldeutschen Zeitung stories since 1 April 1994

1990 establishments in Germany
German-language newspapers
Mass media in Halle (Saale)
Daily newspapers published in Germany
Publications established in 1990